Shrirampur  District is a proposed district in Maharashtra which is currently subdivision of Ahmednagar district.

It is proposed that Ahmednagar district be divided and a separate Shrirampur District be carved out of existing district with the inclusion of the northern parts of Ahmednagar district which include Rahata, Rahuri, Shrirampur, Sangamner, Akole, Kopargaon  and Nevasa talukas in the proposed  Shrirampur District. 
But the final result remain undeclared because fight between Sangamner, Shrirampur and Shirdi.

Currently Shrirampur is being considered as district headquarters due to its geographical location. Shrirampur Jilha Kriti Samiti is established by Pratap Bhosale which is a apolitical committee which pursuing for #shrirampurdistrict.

References

Ahmednagar district
Proposed districts in Maharashtra
Shrirampur